Chiladangari  is a village of  Koksara Block in Dharmagarh sub-division  in Kalahandi District in Odisha State. This village  comes under Phupagaon panchayat of  Kokasara Tehsil in Kalahandi District. It also come under kasibahal RI circle. Chiladangari is 7 km distance from Koksara and 60 km distance from its District Main City Bhawanipatna. And 333 km distance from its State Main City Bhubaneswar.

Demographics
According to census 2001, total population of Chiladangari was 1,000.

Education
Schools nearby Chiladangari

Chiladangari primary school

chiladangari M.E school
saraswati sihu mandir kusumkhunti
Phupagaon M.E school
Phupagaon High School

Colleges nearby Chiladangari

I v college Jaipatna
Ladugaon Higher Secondary School, Ladugaon
Panchayat Samiti Degree College, Koksara
L.A. +2 Junior College, Behera

References

http://wikimapia.org/24373237/chiladangari
https://maps.google.co.in/maps?q=chiladangari&ie=UTF-8&ei=ik97Uo3ZD8G_rgen54HwCA&ved=0CAoQ_AUoAg

Villages in Kalahandi district